Wat Arun Ratchawararam Ratchawaramahawihan or Wat Arun ("Temple of Dawn") is a Buddhist temple (wat) in Bangkok Yai district of Bangkok, Thailand, on the Thonburi west bank of the Chao Phraya River. The temple derives its name from the Hindu god Aruṇa, often personified as the radiations of the rising sun. Wat Arun is among the best known of Thailand's landmarks. The first light of the morning reflects off the surface of the temple with pearly iridescence. Although the temple has existed since at least the seventeenth century, its distinctive prang (spire) was built in the early nineteenth century during the reigns of Rama II and Rama III.

History

A Buddhist temple had existed at the site of Wat Arun since the time of the Ayutthaya Kingdom. It was then known as Wat Makok, after the village of Bang Makok in which it was built. (Makok is the Thai name for the Spondias pinnata plant.) According to the historian Prince Damrong Rajanubhab, the temple was shown in French maps during the reign of Narai (1656–88). The temple was renamed Wat Chaeng by Taksin (1767–82) when he established his new capital of Thonburi near the temple, following the fall of Ayutthaya. It is believed that Taksin vowed to restore the temple after passing it at dawn. The temple enshrined the Emerald Buddha image before it was transferred to Wat Phra Kaew on the river's eastern bank in 1784. The temple was on the grounds of the royal palace during Taksin's reign, before his successor, Rama I (1782–1809), moved the palace to the other side of the river.  It was abandoned until the reign of Rama II (1809–24), who had the temple restored and had begun plans to raise the main pagoda to 70 m. The work on the pagoda commenced during the reign of Rama III (1824–51). The main prang was completed in 1851, after nine years of continued construction.

The temple underwent major restorations during the reign of Chulalongkorn (Rama V, 1868–1910) and in 1980, prior to the bicentenary celebration of Bangkok's foundation. The most extensive restoration work on the prang was undertaken from 2013 to 2017, during which a substantial number of broken tiles were replaced and lime plaster was used to re-finish many of the surfaces (replacing the cement used during earlier restorations). As the work neared its end in 2017, photographs of the results drew some criticism for the temple's new appearance, which seemed white-washed compared to its previous state. The Fine Arts Department defended the work, stating that it was carefully done to reflect the temple's original appearance.

Architecture

The main feature of Wat Arun is its central prang, which is encrusted with colourful porcelain.  This is interpreted as a stupa-like pagoda encrusted with coloured faience. The height is reported by different sources as between 66.8 m (219 ft) and 86 m (282 ft). The corners are surrounded by four smaller satellite prang. The prang are decorated by shells of Mauritia mauritiana and bits of porcelain, which had previously been used as ballast by boats coming to Bangkok from China.

The central prang is topped with a seven-pronged trident, referred to by many sources as the "Trident of Shiva". Around the base of the prang are various figures of ancient Chinese soldiers and animals. Over the second terrace are four statues of the Hindu god Indra riding on Erawan.  In Buddhist iconography, the central prang is considered to have three symbolic levels—base for Traiphum indicating all realms of existence, middle for Tavatimsa, the Tusita Heaven  where all desires are gratified, and the top denoting Devaphum indicating six heavens within seven realms of happiness.  At the riverside are six pavilions (sala) in the Chinese style. The pavilions are made of green granite and contain landing bridges.

Next to the prang is the Ordination Hall with a Niramitr Buddha image supposedly designed by Rama II. The front entrance of the Ordination Hall has a roof with a central spire, decorated in coloured ceramic and stuccowork sheathed in coloured china. Inside, there is a grand altar with a red, grey and white marble decoration.  There are two demons, or temple guardian figures, in front.  The murals were created during the reign of Rama V.

Cosmology
The central prang symbolises Mount Meru of the Hindu cosmology. The satellite prang are devoted to the wind god, Phra Phai. The demons (yaksha) at the entranceway to the ubosot are from the Ramakien. The white figure is named Sahassa Deja and the green one is known as Thotsakan, the Demon Rāvana from Ramayana.

Travel
Wat Arun can be accessed through the Chao Phraya River, and ferries travel across the river towards the Maharaj pier. For foreigners, the temple charges an entrance fee of 100 baht (as of January 2021). During Kathina, the king travels to Wat Arun in a procession of royal barges to present new robes to the monks there.

Gallery

See also

Citations

General references

External links

 
 Panoramic view of the temple
 

Arun
Bangkok Yai district
Buildings and structures on the Chao Phraya River
Registered ancient monuments in Bangkok
Arun